Alistair Roy (born 26 May 1997) is a professional footballer born in Scotland who plays as a striker for Greenock Morton, on loan from Glentoran.

Career
Roy was born in Airdrie. On 20 August 2014, Roy debuted for the Hearts first-team at the age of 17, coming on as a 65th-minute substitute in a Scottish Challenge Cup match versus Livingston, replacing Liam Gordon in a 4–1 defeat. Roy went on to make his league debut in a victory over Raith Rovers on 23 August 2014.

In July 2015, Roy moved out on loan to Scottish League Two club East Stirlingshire until January 2016. Roy signed a new one-year deal with the Jambos in March 2016, and was loaned out to Scottish League One club Stenhousemuir at the beginning of the 2016–17 season.

After signing a new contract with Hearts in the summer of 2017, he joined Scottish Championship club Dumbarton on loan until January 2018. Roy scored his first goal for the Sons in a 1–1 draw with Falkirk in August 2017. After making 25 appearances for the Sons, scoring three goals, Roy returned to Hearts in January 2018. Roy was then loaned out to Irish club Sligo Rovers in February 2018, on a deal due to run until 30 June 2018.

Roy departed Hearts and signed for Derry City in July 2018, where he remained for the duration of the League of Ireland season before joining Scottish Championship club Partick Thistle in January 2019.

On 10 June 2019, Roy signed for Airdrieonians, where he remained for two seasons until 31 May 2021.

On 10 June 2021, Roy signed for Scottish Championship club Queen of the South in a one-year deal. On 24 July 2021, Roy scored his first hat-trick for the Doonhamers at Palmerston in the Premier Sports Cup versus Airdrieonians in a 4–1 win. Following relegation to Scottish League One, Roy was released by the club at the end of the 2021–22 season.

On 1 June 2022, Roy signed a two-year deal with Glentoran.  On 10 January 2023, Roy joined Scottish Championship club Greenock Morton on loan until the end of the season.

Career statistics

References

External links

1997 births
Living people
Scottish footballers
Association football forwards
Heart of Midlothian F.C. players
East Stirlingshire F.C. players
Scottish Professional Football League players
Stenhousemuir F.C. players
Dumbarton F.C. players
Sligo Rovers F.C. players
Derry City F.C. players
Partick Thistle F.C. players
Airdrieonians F.C. players
Queen of the South F.C. players
Greenock Morton F.C. players
Footballers from Airdrie, North Lanarkshire
Association footballers from Northern Ireland
Northern Ireland under-21 international footballers
Scottish people of Northern Ireland descent